Group 6 of the UEFA Women's Euro 2017 qualifying competition consisted of five teams: Italy, Switzerland, Czech Republic, Northern Ireland, and Georgia. The composition of the eight groups in the qualifying group stage was decided by the draw held on 20 April 2015.

The group was played in home-and-away round-robin format. The group winners qualified directly for the final tournament, while the runners-up also qualified directly if they were one of the six best runners-up among all eight groups (not counting results against the fifth-placed team); otherwise, the runners-up advance to the play-offs.

Standings

Matches
Times are CEST (UTC+2) for dates between 29 March and 24 October 2015 and between 27 March and 29 October 2016, for other dates times are CET (UTC+1).

Game was originally scheduled for 8 April 2016 at 20:30 but was postponed due to an accident on the motorway, which made it impossible for the teams to arrive at the stadium.

Goalscorers
7 goals

 Ana-Maria Crnogorčević

6 goals

 Cristiana Girelli
 Fabienne Humm

5 goals

 Ilaria Mauro

4 goals

 Lucie Voňková
 Ramona Bachmann

3 goals

 Raffaella Manieri
 Daniela Sabatino
 Rachel Furness
 Lara Dickenmann
 Martina Moser

2 goals

 Irena Martínková
 Lucie Martínková
 Barbara Bonansea
 Avilla Bergin
 Marissa Callaghan
 Simone Magill
 Vanessa Bernauer
 Rahel Kiwic
 Meriame Terchoun

1 goal

 Eva Bartoňová
 Klára Cahynová
 Jitka Chlastáková
 Kateřina Svitková
 Gulnara Gabelia
 Natia Skhirtladze
 Elisa Bartoli
 Valentina Cernoia
 Melania Gabbiadini
 Manuela Giugliano
 Alia Guagni
 Alice Parisi
 Daniela Stracchi
 Julie Nelson
 Vanessa Bürki
 Barla Deplazes
 Florijana Ismaili
 Rachel Rinast

1 own goal

 Natia Skhirtladze (playing against Switzerland)
 Ana Zakhaidze (playing against Czech Republic)

References

External links
Standings, UEFA.com

Group 6